Man Bait is a 1926 American silent comedy film directed by Donald Crisp and starring Marie Prevost, Douglas Fairbanks Jr., and Kenneth Thomson.

Plot
After she is fired from her role as a shopgirl in a department store, Madge finds work as a taxi dancer. At the dance hall she meets and falls in love with a young man from a wealthy background.

Cast

Preservation
With no prints of Man Bait in any film archives, it is a lost film.

References

Bibliography
 Jeffrey Vance & Tony Maietta. Douglas Fairbanks. University of California Press, 2008.

External links

1926 films
1926 comedy films
Silent American comedy films
Films directed by Donald Crisp
American silent feature films
1920s English-language films
Producers Distributing Corporation films
American black-and-white films
1920s American films